Euphemia de Ross (1329–1386), a member of Clan Ross, was Queen of Scots as the second wife of Robert II of Scotland.

Life
Euphemia was a daughter of Hugh, Earl of Ross, and Margaret de Graham, Hugh's second wife and daughter of Sir John de Graham of Abercorn. She first married John Randolph, 3rd Earl of Moray, but the marriage was childless. Her husband died in 1346, and she remained a widow for nine years.

On 2 May 1355, Euphemia married Robert Stewart, sole son of Walter Stewart, 6th High Steward of Scotland and Marjorie Bruce. Marjorie was a daughter of Robert I of Scotland (Robert The Bruce), and his first wife, Isabella of Mar. Over a decade earlier, her second husband, Robert, had been joint Regent of Scotland with her first husband.

It appears that there was an obstacle of affinity to this second marriage, and a papal dispensation by Pope Innocent VI was required for it to be recognized by the Catholic Church. The affinity was due to her first husband, John Randolph, Earl of Moray, having been a second cousin of Robert Stewart.  There also was a blood relationship, as the dispensation referenced their being related in the fourth degree of consanguinity, but this relationship has as yet not been identified. The children of Robert's first marriage to Elizabeth Mure were considered illegitimate by some due to reasons of consanguinity. Both sets of children from each marriage considered themselves rightful heirs to the throne, which constituted considerable future conflict.

Euphemia and Robert were parents to four children, and grandparents to many grandchildren:
David Stewart, 1st Earl of Caithness (b. 1357 - d. bef. 1389), married Euphemia Lindsay, daughter of Sir Alexander Lindsay of Glenesk, of Clan Lindsay
Euphemia Stewart, Countess of Strathearn (died c. 1434), married Patrick Graham, Earl of Strathearn (d. 10 August 1413), of Clan Graham, and had issue.
Walter Stewart, 1st Earl of Atholl (b. 1360 – d. 1437), married Margaret Barclay, Lady of Brechin, of Clan Barclay
Alan Stewart, 4th Earl of Caithness (d. 1431)
David Stewart, Master of Atholl (d. bef. 1437)
Elizabeth Stewart, married David Lindsay, 1st Earl of Crawford (c. 1360 – 1407), of Clan Lindsay
Gerard Lindsay (d. before 1421)
Ingram Lindsay, Bishop of Aberdeen (d. 1458)
Marjorie Lindsay, married Sir William Douglas of Clan Douglas
Alexander Lindsay, 2nd Earl of Crawford (c. 1387–1438)
David Lindsay, Lord of Newdosk (1407–?); he later became a priest
Elizabeth Lindsay; she married Sir Robert Keith of Clan Keith
Elizabeth Lindsay (1407–?); married Robert Erskine, 1st Lord Erskine, of Clan Erskine; she may have been confused with her sister of the same name, and it is possible that they were one and the same person.
Isabella Lindsay (1407–?), married Sir John Maxwell of Pollok, of Clan Maxwell, and had issue.
Egidia Stewart, married Sir William Douglas of Nithsdale (c. 1370 – 1391), the illegitimate son of Archibald the Grim, 3rd Earl of Douglas, of Clan Douglas
Egidia Douglas, "Fair Maid of Nithsdale", married firstly to Henry Sinclair, 2nd Earl of Orkney (d. 1422), of Clan Sinclair, and married secondly to Sir Alasdair Stewart (executed 1425), son of Murdoch Stewart, 2nd Duke of Albany.
Sir William Douglas, Knt., Lord of Nithsdale (died c.1419)

Robert II succeeded his childless maternal uncle David II of Scotland in 1371. Euphemia was then queen for about fifteen years, until her death in 1386.

References 

Ross
Scottish royal consorts
14th-century Scottish people
14th-century Scottish women
Caithness
Clan Ross
House of Stuart
14th-century births